Katrina Cunningham (born November 12, 1989) is an American actor, model, dancer and musician. They performed in Les Liaisons Dangereuses (2016), Cirque Du Soleil's Paramour, and NYC's Sleep No More. Cunning appeared in the recurring role of Christina Fuego in the later two seasons of The Deuce on HBO starring James Franco and Maggie Gyllenhaal. More recently, Cunning starred as the mysterious chanteuse Sabine in the Netflix series Trinkets based on the books by Kirsten Smith.

Early life and education
Cunning was born in Gresham, Oregon and began dancing at the age of three. They are of Greek descent, and the middle of three children with two brothers.
They graduated a year early from Centennial High School in 2007 in order to start their career in dance sooner.
Cunning received a BFA in Dance from SUNY Purchase.

Career 
Cunning began their career by performing in Baroque-Burlesque Operas with Company XIV. Following their 2016 Broadway debut, they performed in Refinery 29's sold out 29 Rooms and opened for the sold out North American Tour for LP.

Their singles "Baby" "Wild Poppies" and "Stay on the Line" have received praise for their overt displays of queer sexuality.

Cunning appears as Christina Fuego in The Deuce on HBO.

Cunning plays Sabine in the Netflix show Trinkets, and their original songs "Birds" and "King of Shadow" are featured on the show.

For the 2019 Hulu adaptation of John Green's Looking For Alaska, Cunning covered Alexi Murdoch's Orange Sky.

Their single "For The Love" has been called a "rallying cry for hope and strength in the face of adversity" by Billboard.

On August 20, 2020, Cunning officially signed with Lava Records.

Personal life
Residing in Los Angeles, Cunning is queer and non-binary, using they/them pronouns.

Awards 
 Best Actor. Nothing Serious. 2016 Trail Dance Film Festival
 Best Supporting Actor. Pepper and the Salt Sea. 2016 Damn! Series

References

External links

1989 births
Actors from New York (state)
Actors from Oregon
American non-binary actors
American LGBT musicians
Singer-songwriters from Oregon
Queer actors
Queer artists
Queer feminists
American dancers
Living people
LGBT people from Oregon
Feminist musicians
Non-binary musicians
Non-binary models
Non-binary artists
State University of New York at Purchase alumni